The Stadion Střelnice (formerly known as Chance Arena) is a multi-use stadium in Jablonec nad Nisou, Czech Republic.  It is currently used mostly for football matches and is the home ground of FK Jablonec.  The stadium's current capacity is 6,108.

The stadium was the venue for the final of the 2008 UEFA European Under-19 Football Championship, and it also hosted two earlier group games in the tournament.

International matches
Stadion Střelnice has hosted three friendly matches of the Czech Republic national football team

References

External links
Stadium photos at stadiony.net
Photo gallery and data at Erlebnis-stadion.de

Football venues in the Czech Republic
Czech First League venues
FK Jablonec
Sports venues in the Liberec Region
1955 establishments in Czechoslovakia
Sports venues completed in 1955
20th-century architecture in the Czech Republic